The Brown Tavern is a historic house and public accommodation at George Washington Turnpike and Connecticut Route 4 in Burlington, Connecticut, USA. Probably built in the early 19th century, it is a fine example of Federal period architecture, its design tentatively credited to the New Haven architect David Hoadley. Now managed by the local historical society, it was listed on the National Register of Historic Places in 1972.

Description and history
The Brown Tavern stands facing Burlington's triangular town green, on the south side of George Washington Turnpike at the green's western end. It is a 2½ story wood-frame structure, with a front-facing gable roof and clapboarded exterior. The main facade is five bays wide, with an elaborate Federal style entrance surround at the center. The entry is flanked by sidelight windows and pilasters, and is topped by a half-round transom window and shallow gabled hood.  Above the entrance is a Palladian window with a rounded center that breaks the moulding at the roof eave. The front gable is fully pedimented, with dentil moulding around the edges and a Federal style semi-oval fan at the center.

The building is believed to have been built about 1809-10 for Giles Griswold, a merchant; its design has been speculatively attributed to New Haven architect David Hoadley. It has passed through a succession of owners, some of whom operated a tavern on the premises in the 19th century. The building was acquired by the town in 1974.

See also
National Register of Historic Places listings in Hartford County, Connecticut

References

Commercial buildings on the National Register of Historic Places in Connecticut
Houses on the National Register of Historic Places in Connecticut
National Register of Historic Places in Hartford County, Connecticut
Federal architecture in Connecticut
Buildings and structures in Hartford County, Connecticut
Burlington, Connecticut